Dubbo College is a government-funded secondary school located in Dubbo, in the Orana region of New South Wales, Australia.

The college consists of three campuses; the Delroy and South campuses for years 7-10 and the Senior campus for years 11–12.

History 
Dubbo College was formed to bring together the three state schools in Dubbo. Dubbo High School officially opened on 8 July 1917 and the original building operated for 84 years before it was closed in June 2001. In 1962 the Minister for Education announced a second high school, Dubbo High South, to deal with increasing numbers of students.

Dubbo High School published a quarterly school magazine called "the bindyite" which began in June 1918.

The Astley Cup is an annual inter-school sports contest between Bathurst High Campus, Orange High School, and Dubbo College. The competition was founded in 1923 and continues to the present day.

Notable alumni 

 Rawden Middleton VC - RAAF pilot and Victoria Cross recipient.
 Tim Armstrong - Cricketer.

References 

Educational institutions established in 1917
Public high schools in New South Wales
1917 establishments in Australia